Pikula is the surname of the following people:
 Chris Pikula, American gamer
 Dejan Pikula (born 1969), Serbian chess player
 Joe Pikula (1944–2015), Canadian football player
 Rob Pikula (born 1981), Canadian football player

See also
 
Jonah Justin Pikulas, Malagasy politician